Girolamo Lusco (died 1509) was a Roman Catholic prelate who served as Bishop of Strongoli (1496–1509).

Biography
On 2 Dec 1496, Girolamo Lusco was appointed by Pope Alexander VI as Bishop of Strongoli.
He served as Bishop of Strongoli until his death in 1509.

References

External links and additional sources
 (for Chronology of Bishops) 
 (for Chronology of Bishops) 

1509 deaths
16th-century Italian Roman Catholic bishops
Bishops appointed by Pope Alexander VI
15th-century Italian Roman Catholic bishops